Edgar Norton (born Harry Edgar Mills; August 11, 1868 – February 6, 1953) was an English-born American character actor.

Early years
Norton was born in Islington in London, England, on August 11, 1868, as Harry Edgar Mills, one of eight children of Jane Anne née Fleming and Frederic Mills, a clerk in the Home Office department of the Civil Service.

Career 
Norton was active on both stage and screen, his theater performances were on both the London and Broadway stages, and his film career spanned both the silent and "talkie" eras in Hollywood. Aged 18, he appeared as the Hare in the original production of Alice in Wonderland in London in 1886, with the production being under the guidance of Lewis Carroll, who saw the musical five times. 

During his thirty-year film career, he appeared in at least ninety films. Many consider his most memorable role to be that of Poole, the butler to Dr. Jekyll in the 1931 classic, Dr. Jekyll and Mr. Hyde— a role he had been playing on-stage since 1898, opposite Richard Mansfield as Jekyll.

Personal life and death 
Norton moved permanently to the United States in 1889, and was naturalised as an American citizen in 1927.  He married his Detroit-born wife Lillian Mable née Hubbard in Ontario in Canada in 1890, and with her had a son, Edgar Norton Mills. 

He died in the Woodland Hills section of Los Angeles in February 1953.

Filmography

(Per AFI database)

The Ocean Waif (1916) - Valentine Borroyer
The Beautiful Adventure (1917) - Valentine Borroyer
The Amazons (1917) - Lord Tweenways
 A Pair of Cupids (1918) - Martin
The New York Idea (1920) - Thomas
The Light in the Dark (1922) - Peters
Woman-Proof (1923) - Cecil Updyke
Broadway After Dark (1924) - The Old Actor
The Fast Set (1924) - Archie Wells
The Female (1924) - Clyde Wiel
Men (1924) - The baron
Tiger Love (1924) - Don Victoriano Fuentes
The Wolf Man (1924) - Sir Reginald Stackpoole
Enticement (1925) - William Blake
The King on Main Street (1925) - Jensen
Learning To Love (1925) - Butler
Lost: A Wife (1925) - Baron Deliguières
The Marriage Whirl (1925) - Dick Mayne
A Regular Fellow (1925) - Valet
The Boy Friend (1926) - (uncredited)
Diplomacy (1926) - British embassy servant 
 The Lady from Hell (1926) - Hon. Charles Darnely
Marriage License? (1927) - Beadon
Fast and Furious (1927) - Englishman
Singed (1927) - Ernie Whitehead
My Friend from India (1927) - Jennings, a butler
The Man Who Laughs (1928) - Lord High Chancellor
Oh, Kay! (1928) - Lord Braggot
The Student Prince in Old Heidelberg (1928) - Lutz
The Love Parade (1929) - Master of ceremonies
The Girl Said No (1930) - Butler
The Man From Blankley's (1930) - Dawes
One Romantic Night (1930) - Colonel Wunderlich
The Runaway Bride (1930) - Williams
The Lady of Scandal (1930) - Morton
Monte Carlo (1930) - Minor Role (uncredited)
A Lady Surrenders (1930) - Butler
 Charley's Aunt (1930) - Spettigue's Lawyer
Du Barry, Woman of Passion (1930) - Renal
East Is West (1930) - Thomas
The Bachelor Father (1931) - Bolton
The Lady Refuses (1931) - Dobbs
Meet the Wife (1931) - Williams
Compromised (1931) - Tipton
Dr. Jekyll and Mr. Hyde (1931) - Poole
The Man Called Back (1932) - Secretary
Love Me Tonight (1932) - Valet
A Lady's Profession (1933) - Crotchett
Sing, Sinner, Sing (1933) - Roberts the butler
The Big Brain (1933) - Butler
The Worst Woman in Paris? (1933) - Valet
Only Yesterday (1933) - George, the butler
Imitation of Life (1934) - Butler
We Live Again (1934) - Judge
The Richest Girl in the World (1934) - The butler, Binkley
Sons of Steel (1934) - Higgins
Thirty Day Princess (1934) - Baron Passeria
Million Dollar Ransom (1934) - Meigs
Stingaree (1934) - Governor's first aide
The Girl from 10th Avenue (1935) - Butler
When a Man's a Man (1935) - Gibbs
Vagabond Lady (1935) - Chauffeur
East of Java (1935) - Resident
Give Me Your Heart (1936) - Servant
August Weekend (1936) - Grimsby
Dracula's Daughter (1936) - Hobbs
The Bohemian Girl (1936)
45 Fathers (1937) - Van Brunt
You Can't Buy Luck (1937) - RiversMaytime (1937) - SecretaryStage Door (1937) - Minor Role (uncredited)Bill Cracks Down (1937) - JarvisThe Big Broadcast of 1938 (1938) - Secretary to T. F. BellowsSon of Frankenstein (1939) - Thomas BensonCaptain Fury (1939) - Governor's aideRulers of the Sea (1939) - Mr. McKinnonThe Mad Empress (1939) - (uncredited)A Chump at Oxford (1940) - Professor WitherspoonBrother Orchid (1940) - MeadowsThe House of the Seven Gables (1940) - Phineas WeedRings on Her Fingers (1942) - PaulHappy Go Lucky (1943) - Captain of waitersPractically Yours (1944) - Harvey, butlerAre These Our Parents (1944) - ButlerThe Suspect (1944) - FrazerCaptain Kidd (1945) - NoblemanDoll Face (1945) - Soho, the butlerKitty (1946) - Earl of CamptonDevotion (1946) - Club memberOur Hearts Were Growing Up (1946) - ButlerBob, Son of Battle (1947) - Parson Leggy HornbutThe Woman in White'' (1948) - Night clerk

References

External links

 
 
 

1868 births
1953 deaths
Male actors from London
English male stage actors
American male stage actors
American male film actors
English male film actors
American male silent film actors
English male silent film actors
20th-century English male actors
British emigrants to the United States
20th-century American male actors